Ragbi Klub Mornar Bar (Montenegrin:Рагби клуб Морнар Бар, English: Rugby Club Mornar Bar) is a Montenegrin rugby club based in Bar, Montenegro. It was founded in 2013. The club plays in the Montenegrin national division. During its first match in Bar, Mornar played against Nikšić on April 19, 2014.

Current squad
The provisional Mornar Bar Rugby Squad for the 2022–23 season is:

External links
Rugby Klub Mornar Bar on facebook

References

Montenegrin rugby union teams
Sport in Bar, Montenegro